Michael Hall, better known as Mike Hall (born 3 April 1974), is an English sports journalist and presenter for ITV regional news programme Granada Reports.

Brought up in Wigan, Hall worked for a local newspaper in the Newton-le-Willows area before joining ITV Granada's sports department in 2000, making his on-screen debut six years later. Alongside sports reporting duties, he is also a stand-in presenter for the programme.

In November 2014, Hall won the award for Broadcast Presenter of the Year at the O2 North West Media Awards.

References

External links

Living people
ITV regional newsreaders and journalists
1974 births